The KB-2 Freedom Machine is an autogyro designed by Ken Brock based on the designs of the Bensen B-8.

Design and development
Ken Brock was an early innovator in homebuilt gyrocopters starting with his first ride in 1957. Brock set to work on building and marketing a series of homebuilt gyroplanes with the KB-1 and later the KB-2.

Operational history
Ken Brock used his KB-2 design for years in airshow acts and completed several world records. In 1971 he completed the first coast-to-coast autogyro flight from Long Beach, California to Kitty Hawk, North Carolina.

Variants
KB-2
Powered variant
KB-2G
Variant with the same frame and rotor head as a KB-2. The "glider" is a two-seat gyroplane designed to be towed by car. The aircraft with the same frame and rotor assembly can be converted to a powered gyroplane.

Aircraft on display
A 1970 demonstrator KB-2  is in the EAA Airventure Museum in Oshkosh, Wisconsin

Specifications (KB-2)

See also

References

1970s United States sport aircraft
Single-engined pusher autogyros
Homebuilt aircraft
Ken Brock aircraft
Aircraft first flown in 1970